Hemiliostraca diagues is a species of sea snail, a marine gastropod mollusk in the family Eulimidae.

Distribution

This species occurs in the following locations:

 Angola
 Cape Verde
 Gulf of Guinea

References

Eulimidae
Molluscs of the Atlantic Ocean
Molluscs of Angola
Gastropods of Cape Verde
Gastropods described in 1915